Israr Ahmed (born 16 November 1997 in Lahore) is a Pakistani professional squash player. As of February 2018, he was ranked number 159 in the world.

References

1997 births
Living people
Pakistani male squash players
Asian Games medalists in squash
Asian Games bronze medalists for Pakistan
Squash players at the 2018 Asian Games
Medalists at the 2018 Asian Games
21st-century Pakistani people